Tito Steiner (born March 1, 1952 in Paraguay) is a retired decathlete of German descent who represented Argentina in the 1970s and 1980s.  He is the current Argentine record holder in the event.



Career

He set a national record in 1981, collecting 8,279 points at a meet in Baton Rouge, United States (1981-06-03). He bested this with a score of 8,291 points, set on June 23, 1983, which is still the national record. Steiner won the silver medal at the 1979 Pan American Games in San Juan, Puerto Rico.

He finished fourth at the 1975 Pan American Games and 22nd at the Montreal 1976 Summer Olympics. In 1977, while competing for Brigham Young University he earned All-American honors and the  NCAA title with a score of 7,659 points.  He went on to win the honor three more times, a rare athlete to achieve All-American all four competitive years.  He set the national record while winning the Texas Relays in 1979, defeating the meet record by C.K. Yang.  He later improved upon the record in 1983 at Provo, but the meet was hand timed, common for all but the top level decathlons of that era.  Decades later, hand timed marks are not as respected as fully automatic timing.

References

External links
 1981 Year List
 
 Olympics Profile

1952 births
Living people
Argentine decathletes
Brigham Young University alumni
Athletes (track and field) at the 1976 Summer Olympics
Athletes (track and field) at the 1975 Pan American Games
Athletes (track and field) at the 1979 Pan American Games
Athletes (track and field) at the 1983 Pan American Games
Olympic athletes of Argentina
Pan American Games silver medalists for Argentina
Pan American Games medalists in athletics (track and field)
Paraguayan people of German descent
Argentine people of German descent
Place of birth missing (living people)
Paraguayan emigrants to Argentina
Naturalized citizens of Argentina
South American Games silver medalists for Argentina
South American Games medalists in athletics
Competitors at the 1982 Southern Cross Games
Medalists at the 1979 Pan American Games